Tornodoxa paraleptopalta is a moth in the family Gelechiidae. It was described by Ueda in 2012. It is found in Japan (Honshu, Kyushu).

The forewings are whitish, irregularly tinged with pale brownish grey and scattered with fuscous scales. The dorsal half is tinged with pale brownish grey. The hindwings are light grey.

References

Chelariini
Moths described in 2012